William Louden Burns (January 24, 1913 – January 11, 2005) was born in Amityville, Suffolk County, Long Island, New York on January 24, 1913. He was an American Politician from the Republican Party and served as a Member of the New York State Assembly from 1966 to 1977. William L. Burns represented New York's 7th Assembly District in 1966, the 5th Assembly District from 1967 to 1973, and the 9th Assembly District from 1973 to 1977.

He died on January 11, 2005, and was buried at Amityville Cemetery, in Amityville, New York.

References

1913 births
2005 deaths
People from Amityville, New York
Republican Party members of the New York State Assembly
20th-century American politicians